Anton Oleksandrovych Tsarenko (born 17 June 2004) is a Ukrainian professional footballer who plays as an attacking midfielder for Ukrainian Premier League club Dynamo Kyiv.

Club career
Tsarenko is a product of the Dynamo Kyiv academy and he plays for Dynamo Kyiv in the Ukrainian Premier League Reserves.

In January 2022 he signed a 3 years deal with Dynamo and in June-July 2022 participated in the summer training camp with the main team squad. Tsarenko made his debut for Dynamo Kyiv on 17 August 2022, playing as a second half-time substitution player in a losing match against Portuguese club Benfica in the 2022–23 UEFA Champions League play-off round.

Career statistics

Club

References

External links
 
 

2004 births
Living people
People from Konotop
Ukrainian footballers
Ukraine youth international footballers
Association football midfielders
FC Dynamo Kyiv players
Ukrainian Premier League players